Mark Isaakovich Prudkin (14 September 1898 – 24 September 1994) was a Soviet and Russian actor of theater and cinema. People's Artist of the USSR (1961). Hero of Socialist Labor (1989). Laureate of three Stalin Prizes (1946, 1947, 1949).

Biography
Mark Isaakovich Prudkin was born on 1 September (13), 1898 (according to other sources – 2 September (14), 1898) in the town of Klin (now the Moscow Region) in the family of tailor Isaak Lvovich Prudkin (1871–1949) and musician Rakhil Lazarevna Prudkina (maiden name - Sot, 1880–1945).

He became interested in theater while still studying in the Klin Realschule, took part in amateur theater performances. From 1918 to 1924 he was a student and actor in the 2nd Studio of the Moscow Art Theater (in parallel from 1918 to 1919 he studied at the Faculty of Law of Moscow State University).

Since 1924, Mark Prudkin worked in the Moscow Art Theatre (since 1989 - in the Moscow Art Theater named after Chekhov).

In the studio, he especially succeeded in the roles of the heroic-romantic type - Karl Moor, "The Robbers" by Friedrich Schiller (1923), Don Luis in "The Invisible Lady Calderon" (1924), Chatsky in "Woe from Wit" by Alexander Griboedov (1925). Over time, the creative range of Prudkin expanded, which contributed to his talent of transformation, the ability to delve into the psychological essence of the created image, attention to external attributes – costume, makeup, facial expressions. All this allowed the actor to show on the stage a variety of characters, sometimes opposite in character, such as the frivolous adjutant Shervinsky, "The Days of the Turbins" by Mikhail Bulgakov (1926), the gloomy captain Nezelasov, "Armored train 14–69" by Vsevolod Ivanov (1927), the self-confident and cowardly Kastalsky, "The Fear" by Alexander Afinogenov (1932), Vronsky (1937) and Karenin (1957) in "Anna Karenina" by Leo Tolstoy, Dulchin, The Last Victim by Nikolai Ostrovsky (1946), ambitious careerist engineer Mehti-Aga, "Deep exploration" by Alexander Kron, Fyodor Karamazov, "The Brothers Karamazov" by Fyodor Dostoyevsky (1961), Baker, "The Winter of our Discontent" based on the novel by John Steinbeck (1964).

Together with Olga Androvskaya and other "great old men" of the Moscow Art Theater – Alexey Gribov, Viktor Stanitsyn and Mikhail Yanshin played in a specially staged for them famous play "Solo for Clock Chime" based on the play by Osvald Zahradník (1973). In 1983, he played Pontius Pilate in the play "The Candle Ball" based on the novel by Mikhail Bulgakov "The Master and Margarita", staged by his son, Vladimir Prudkin.

In 1969, The Brothers Karamazov was released, with Mark Prudkin in the role of Fyodor Karamazov – the same one that he played on stage. Apart from a tiny episode in the silent film by Yakov Protazanov Man from the Restaurant, it was his first role in the cinema at the age of 71. He played small but memorable roles in the films The Twelve Chairs, The Blonde Around the Corner, Autumn Wind, in the television movie Uncle's Dream by Fyodor Dostoyevsky and others.

In 1943, Mark Prudkin was one of the supervisors of the Moscow Art Theater – the artistic and director's union, which consisted of five people.

In 1987, a gramophone record was released with records of fragments of the best works by Mark Prudkin in recent years in the theater, on television and radio.

He lived in Moscow, in Glinischevsky Lane, house 5/7.

Mark Isaakovich Prudkin died on 24 September 1994 at the age of 96, 75 of which he devoted to the theater. He was buried in Moscow at the Novodevichy Cemetery (site No. 10).

Personal life
Wife – Ekaterina Ivanovna Prudkina (1918–2007), assistant director (MAT). Honored Worker of Culture of the RSFSR (1975)
Son – Vladimir Prudkin, filmmaker, lives in Europe and Israel
Grandson – Lev Prudkin, filmmaker

Honors and awards
Honored Artist of the RSFSR (1933)
People's Artist of the USSR (1961)
Hero of Socialist Labour (18 August 1989) – for outstanding achievements in the development of Soviet theatrical art
Two Orders of Lenin (1948, 1989)
Order of the October Revolution (1978)
Order of the Red Banner of Labor (1973)
Order of Friendship of Peoples (1983)
Order of the Badge of Honor (1937)
Medal "For the Defence of Moscow" (1946)
Medal "For Valiant Labour in the Great Patriotic War 1941–1945" (1946)
Stalin Prize of the first degree (1946) – for the performance of the role of engineer Mehti-aga in the performance "Deep exploration" by AA Kron
The Stalin Prize of the First Degree (1947) – for the performance of the role of Krivenko in the play "The Winners" by Boris F. Chirskov
The Stalin Prize of the first degree (1949) – for the role of Krutilin in the play "Green Street" by AA Surov
State Prize of the RSFSR named after Stanislavsky (1974) – for high performing skills in the play "Solo for Clock Chime" O. Zahradnik

Theatre
 1918 – "The Green Ring" by Zinaida Gippius – Volodya
 1918 – "The Pattern of Roses" by Fyodor Sologub – Priklonsky
 1923 – "The Robbers" by Friedrich Schiller – Karl Moor
 1924 – "Invisible Lady" by Pedro Calderon – Don Lewis
 1925 – "Woe from Wit" by Alexander Griboedov – Alexander Chatsky
 1925 – "Pugachevshchina" by Konstantin Trenev – Lysov
 1926 – "The Days of the Turbins" by Mikhail Bulgakov – Leonid Shervinsky
 1926 – "Nicholas I and the Decembrists" by Alexander Kugel – Prince Golitsyn
 1927 – "Armored train 14–69" by Vsevolod Ivanov – Captain Nezelasov
 1929 – "Mad Day, or The Marriage of Figaro" by Pierre Beaumarchais – Figaro
 1930 – "Resurrection" by Leo Tolstoy – Prosecutor Breve
 1931 – "The Fear" by Alexander Afinogenov – Kastalsky
 1933 – "Talents and Admirers" by Alexander Ostrovsky – Grigory Bakin
 1935 – "The Enemies" by Maxim Gorky – Mikhail Skrobotov
 1937 – "Anna Karenina" by Leo Tolstoy – Count Alexei Vronsky
 1941 – "Scandalous School" by Richard Sheridan – Sir Joseph Serfes
 1942 – "Front" of Alexander Korneichuk – Gaidar
 1943 – "Deep exploration" of Alexander Kron – Mehti-Aga
 1944 – "The Last Victim" by Alexander Ostrovsky – Vadim Dulchin
 1948 – "The Green Street" by Anatoly Surov – Krutilin
 1951 – "The Lost House" by Sergei Mikhalkov – Ustinov
 1952 – "The Volley of the Aurora" by Manuel Bolshintsov and Mikhail Chiaureli – Alexander Kerensky
 1953 – "Summer Residents" by Maxim Gorky – Sergei Basov
 1956 – "Kremlin chimes" by Nikolai Pogodin – English writer
 1957 – "Anna Karenina" by Leo Tolstoy – Alexei Karenin
 1957 – "The Golden Carriage" by Leonid Leonov – Nikolai Kareev
 1960 – "The Brothers Karamazov" by Fyodor Dostoevsky – Fyodor Karamazov
 1961 – "The Master" I. Sobolev – Kruglakovsky
 1963 – "Egor Bulychov and Others" by Maxim Gorky – Vasily Dostigayev
 1964 – "Winter of our Anxiety" by Joseph Steinbeck – Baker
 1971 – "The Last" by Maxim Gorky – Yakov Kolomiytsev
 1973 – "Enough Stupidity in Every Wise Man" by Alexander Ostrovsky – Krutitsky
 1973 – "Solo for Clock Chime" Osvald Zahradník – Pan Hmelik
 1976 – "Ivanov" by Anton Chekhov – Count Matvey Shabelsky
 1977 – "Chekhov pages" based on the plays and stories by Anton Chekhov – Svetlovidov
 1979 – "It's Over" by Edward Olby – Friend
 1982 – "The Living Corpse" by Leo Tolstoy – Sergei Abrezkov
 1983 – "Candle Ball" by Georgiy Epifantsev for Mikhail Bulgakov's "Master and Margarita" – Pontius Pilate

Filmography
 1927 – Man from the Restaurant – the officer
 1969 – The Brothers Karamazov – Fyodor Karamazov
 1970 – The Strokes to the Portrait of V. I. Lenin – Dr. V.M. Minz
 1970 – Kremlin Chimes – Yegor Dmitriyevich Nikolsky
 1971 – Day after Day – Victor Bogdanov
 1974 – Take Aim – Albert Einstein (uncredited)
 1975 – Swan Song (short film) – actor
 1976 – The Twelve Chairs – Bartholomew Korobeinikov
 1983 – Two Chapters from the Family Chronicle – Gammer
 1983 – The Blonde Around the Corner – Gavrila Maksimovich Poryvaev, Nikolai's father (voiced by Zinovy Gerdt)
 1984 – Lost in the Sands – old man
 1986 – Autumn Wind – Georges

Teleplays
 1962 – The Seventh Satellite – Priklonsky
 1967 – The Kremlin Chimes – a foreign writer
 1969 – Yegor Bulychov and Others – Vasily Dostigayev
 1972 – The Enemies – Mikhail Skrobotov
 1972 – The Last – Yakov
 1974 – Solo for Clock Chime – Hmelik
 1976 – Maria Stuart – George Talbot, Earl of Shrewsbury
 1976 – Enough Stupidity in Every Wise Man – Krutitsky
 1977 – Chekhov Pages – Vasil Vasilich Svetlovidov
 1980 – It's All Over – Friend
 1981 – Uncle's Dream – Prince
 1981 – Ivanov – Shabelsky

References

External links

1898 births
1994 deaths
Soviet male film actors
Soviet male stage actors
Jewish Russian actors
People's Artists of the RSFSR
People from Klin